C. australis  may refer to:
 Ceuthmochares aereus, the Yellowbill, a bird species found in Africa
 Chaetorellia australis, the yellow starthistle peacock fly, a fly species native to southern Europe and the Mediterranean
 Charadrius australis, the Inland Dotterel or Australian Dotterel, a medium-sized plover species found in Australia
 Cirrhigaleus australis, the Southern Mandarin dogfish, a shark species
 Citrus australis, the round lime or Australian lime, a large shrub or small tree found in Australia
 Cordyline australis, the cabbage tree, a monocotyledon plant species endemic to New Zealand
 Ctenomys australis, the Southern tuco-tuco, a rodent species endemic to Argentina.
 Cyathea australis, the rough tree fern, a tree fern species native to Australia
 Cyclaspis australis, a crustacean species in the genus Cyclaspis

See also
 Australis (disambiguation)